Queen Mab is a fairy referred to in William Shakespeare's play Romeo and Juliet, where "she is the fairies' midwife". Later, she appears in other poetry and literature, and in various guises in drama and cinema. In the play, her activity is described in a famous speech by Mercutio published originally in prose and often adapted into iambic pentameter, in which she is a miniature creature who performs midnight pranks upon sleepers. Being driven by a team of atomies, she rides her chariot over their noses and "delivers the fancies of sleeping men". She is also described as a midwife to help sleepers "give birth" to their dreams. Later depictions have typically portrayed her as the Queen of the Fairies.

Origin 
Shakespeare may have borrowed the character of Mab from folklore, but this is debated and there have been numerous theories on the origin of the name. A popular theory holds that Mab derives from Medb (pronounced "Maive" or "Meave"), a legendary queen from 12th-century Irish poetry; however, scholar Gillian Edwards notes “little resemblance” between the two characters. There is marked contrast between the formidable warrior Medb and the tiny dream-bringer Mab.

Other authors such as Wirt Sikes argued that Mab comes from the Welsh "mab" ("child" or "son"), although critics noted the lack of supporting evidence. Thomas Keightley suggested a connection to Habundia or Dame Habonde, a goddess associated with witches in medieval times and sometimes described as a queen.

A more likely origin for Mab's name would be from Mabel and the Middle English derivative "Mabily" (as used by Chaucer) all from the Latin amabilis ("lovable"). Simon Young contends that this fits in with fairy names in British literature of the time, which tended to be generic and monosyllabic. "Mab" was a nickname for a low-class woman or prostitute, or possibly for a haglike witch. Similarly, "queen" is a pun on "quean," a term for a prostitute.

Mercutio's speech 
"O, then, I see Queen Mab hath been with you. 
She is the fairies' midwife, and she comes 
In shape no bigger than an agate-stone 
On the fore-finger of an alderman, 
Drawn with a team of little atomies 
Athwart men's noses as they lies asleep; 
Her wagon-spokes made of long spinners' legs,
The cover of the wings of grasshoppers, 
The traces of the smallest spider's web, 
The collars of the moonshine's wat'ry beams, 
Her whip of cricket's bone; the lash of film; 
Her waggoner a small grey-coated gnat, 
Not half so big as a round little worm 
Pricked from the lazy finger of a maid:
Her chariot is an empty hazelnut 
Made by the joiner squirrel or old grub,
Time out o’ mind the fairies’ coachmakers. 
And in this state she gallops night by night 
Through lovers’ brains, and then they dream of love;
O’er courtiers’ knees, that dream on court'sies straight,
O’er lawyers’ fingers, who straight dream on fees,
O’er ladies' lips, who straight on kisses dream, 
Which oft the angry Mab with blisters plagues, 
Because their breaths with sweetmeats tainted are: 
Sometime she gallops o’er a courtier's nose, 
And then dreams he of smelling out a suit; 
And sometime comes she with a tithe-pig's tail 
Tickling a parson's nose as a’ lies asleep, 
Then dreams, he of another benefice: 
Sometime she driveth o’er a soldier's neck,
And then dreams he of cutting foreign throats, 
Of breaches, ambuscadoes, Spanish blades, 
Of healths five-fathom deep; and then anon 
Drums in his ear, at which he starts and wakes,
And being thus frighted swears a prayer or two
And sleeps again. This is that very Mab 
That plaits the manes of horses in the night,
And bakes the elflocks in foul sluttish hairs, 
Which once untangled, much misfortune bodes: 
This is the hag, when maids lie on their backs, 
That presses them and learns them first to bear, 
Making them women of good carriage: 
This is she—"

— Mercutio in Romeo and Juliet, Act I, scene IV

In other literature 
After her first literary reference (as far as we can tell by examining the surviving literature) in Romeo and Juliet, she appears in works of 17th-century poetry, notably Ben Jonson's "The Entertainment at Althorp" and Michael Drayton's "Nymphidia". In Poole's work Parnassus, Mab is described as the Queen of the Fairies and consort to Oberon, emperor of the Fairies.

"Queen Mab" is a 1750 pantomime by actor Henry Woodward.

Queen Mab appears in Jane Austen’s novel Sense and Sensibility. The horse Willoughboy gifts to Marianne is named Queen Mab. When she declines his gift, he tells her “When you leave Barton to form your own establishment in a more lasting home, Queen Mab shall receive you. (Volume I, chapter XII). 

Queen Mab: A Philosophical Poem (1813) is the title of the first large poetic work written by the famous English Romantic poet Percy Bysshe Shelley (1792–1822).

Herman Melville's epic American novel Moby-Dick (1851) includes a chapter titled "Queen Mab", and it describes a dream by Stubb, Captain Ahab's second mate.

In J. M. Barrie's The Little White Bird (1902), Queen Mab lives in Kensington Gardens and grants Peter Pan – who has learned he is a boy, and thus can no longer fly – his wish to fly again.

American philosopher George Santayana wrote a short piece titled "Queen Mab" which appeared in his 1922 book Soliloquies in England and Later Soliloquies. This particular soliloquy considers English literature as an indirect form of self-expression in which the English writer "will dream of what Queen Mab makes other people dream" rather than revealing him or herself.

Queen Mab is invoked in novels by Elizabeth Goudge, where she describes "Little Things" (based on a collection of tiny objects assembled by a relative and bequeathed to Goudge) such as tiny tea sets, and miniature gnomes, and a tiny sculpture of Queen Mab in her coach, in A City of Bells and The Scent of Water.  

In Jim Butcher's The Dresden Files series, Queen Mab of The Winter Court (also known as 'The Queen of Air and Darkness') is an important recurring character with mysterious motives. Ruler of the Unseelie Sidhe, Mab lives in a dark castle of ice located in the fey worlds of The Nevernever and generally is considered to be incredibly cruel, cold, and a maker of unbreakable pacts.

Queen Mab is the queen of the Unseelie Court in Julie Kagawa's The Iron Fey series.

Queen Mab is one of the three ancient Fae queens, sister to Maeve, and Mora, in Sarah J. Maas's Throne of Glass series.

Queen Mab is a recurring supporting character in the Hellboy comic book series. She is portrayed as the queen over the Irish fairies known as the 
Tuatha Dé Danann and is married to Dagda. Despite watching Hellboy for much of his life they only meet once, in Helllboy: the Wild Hunt.

She appears as Mrs. Mabb in Susanna Clarke's story of the same name in The Ladies of Grace Adieu and Other Stories stealing the affections of the Reynard-like Captain Fox from the heroine Venetia Moore, who must then rescue him from captivity.

Queen Mab briefly appears in Neil Gaiman’s The Sandman comic book series. She instructs her courtier, the faerie Cluracan, to interfere in some mortal political affairs that “would not be a good thing for Faerie.”

In Stephen and Owen King’s book Sleeping Beauties, under the alias Evie Black, the main antagonist of the book suggests she is the one being addressed in the Queen Mab speech by Mercutio in Romeo and Juliet.

In Andrzej Sapkowski's short story Złote popołudnie (The Golden Afternoon), which is a postmodern retelling of Alice's Adventures in Wonderland, the Queen of Hearts is revealed to be really Queen Mab.

In Kate Quinn's 2021 novel The Rose Code, which revolves around Bletchley Park during World War II, one of the three main characters, Mabel Churt, has nicknamed herself Mab after reading Mercutio's speech in Romeo and Juliet.

Queen Mab also appears in The Cruel Prince by Holly Black.

Film and television 

 In the first episode of season four of HBO's original series True Blood, Queen Mab (portrayed by Rebecca Wisocky) is the Queen of Faerie who centuries ago ordered the fae to retreat to the Plane of Faerie in the wake of vampire aggression. Under her orders, humans with fae blood (including Sookie Stackhouse) are being drawn into Faerie as well. When Sookie rebels against her and escapes back to the mortal realm, Queen Mab seals the Faerie portals for good, trapping the half-fae with her and a handful of true fae in Bon Temps.
 Although not connected with him in the original source material, Queen Mab has been featured in media series featuring Merlin. She is portrayed by Miranda Richardson in the 1998 TV miniseries Merlin, serving as prominent antagonist to the title character; she is the dark twin to the Lady of the Lake. 
 In an episode of Hercules: The Legendary Journeys from the same year, she is an evil enchantress who has corrupted Arthur; Merlin sends the pair back in time to learn a lesson in humility from Hercules. 
 The 2008 TV series Merlin features Queen Mab as a character in an episode of the show's fifth season, which portrays her as a diminutive green fairy.
 Though canceled before she appeared, Gargoyles co-creator Greg Weisman says that there were plans to have Mab appear as an antagonist, and that she would have been the insane mother of recurring character Oberon. There were plans to depict her as being very small and/or with four arms.

Video games
In King's Quest VII, Queen Mab is one of several gods, demigods, and other powerful beings, who are kidnapped by the main villainess who threatens the world with destruction, and the viewpoint characters' mission is to rescue them and restore ecological balance.

Queen Mab is a recurring character players can catch and use in battle in the JRPG series Shin Megami Tensei and related titles developed by Atlus

Music 

The composer Hector Berlioz wrote a "Queen Mab" scherzo in his Romeo et Juliette symphony (1839). Hugh Macdonald describes this piece as "Berlioz's supreme exercise in light orchestral texture, a brilliant, gossamer fabric, prestissimo and pianissimo almost without pause... The pace and fascination of the movement are irresistible; it is some of the most ethereally brilliant music ever penned."

The song by the British rock band Queen "The Fairy Feller's Master-Stroke", based on a painting by Richard Dadd and included in the album Queen II, mentions Queen Mab and many other characters such as Oberon and Titania.

Songwriter Becca Stevens set the first half of the text to music on her 2017 album Regina.

In the musical Bare: A Pop Opera a highly edited version of the Queen Mab speech is recited by Peter.

The music video for the British pop band Duran Duran's "Night Boat" features singer Simon Le Bon reciting portions of Mercutio's monologue describing Queen Mab in Shakespeare's Romeo and Juliet.

References 

Fictional fairies and sprites
Characters in Romeo and Juliet
Fairy Queens
Fictional queens
Female Shakespearean characters